Deadline – U.S.A. is a 1952 American film noir crime film and starring Humphrey Bogart, Ethel Barrymore and Kim Hunter, written and directed by Richard Brooks. It is the story of a crusading newspaper editor who exposes a gangster's crimes while also trying to keep the paper from going out of business, and contains a subplot of him trying to reconcile with his ex-wife.

Plot
Ed Hutcheson is the crusading managing editor of a large metropolitan newspaper called The Day. He is steadfastly loyal to publisher Margaret Garrison, the widow of the paper's founder, but Mrs. Garrison is on the verge of selling the newspaper to interests who plan to permanently cease its operation.

Hutcheson has other concerns, including that his former wife Nora is going to remarry. He also puts his reporters to work on the murder of a young woman and the involvement of racketeer Tomas Rienzi, which could turn out to be a circulation builder that keeps the paper in business or else the last big story it ever covers.

Reporters discover that the dead girl, Bessie Schmidt, had been Rienzi's mistress, and that her brother Herman had illegal business dealings with the gangster. Hutcheson gets to Herman with an opportunity to safely tell his story, but Rienzi's thugs, disguised as cops, take him away, resulting in Herman's death.

All seems lost when Mrs. Garrison's daughters, majority stockholders Kitty and Alice, refuse to budge, causing a judge to permit The Day to be sold. Bessie's elderly mother, Mrs. Schmidt, turns up in Hutcheson's office with her daughter's diary and $200,000 in cash, implicating Rienzi in his illegal activities. The presses roll as Hutcheson ignores the gangster's threats.

Cast
 Humphrey Bogart as Ed Hutcheson
 Ethel Barrymore as Margaret Garrison
 Kim Hunter as Nora Hutcheson
 Ed Begley as Frank Allen
 Warren Stevens as George Burrows
 Paul Stewart as Harry Thompson
 Martin Gabel as Tomas Rienzi
 Joseph De Santis as Herman Schmidt
 Joyce MacKenzie as Katherine "Kitty" Garrison Geary
 Audrey Christie as Mrs. Willebrandt
 Fay Baker as Alice Garrison Courtney
 Jim Backus as Jim Cleary
Uncredited
 Carleton Young as Crane, Garrison's daughters' lawyer
 Selmer Jackson as Williams
 Fay Roope as Judge McKay
 Parley Baer as Headwaiter
 John Doucette as Hal
 Florence Shirley as Miss Barndollar
 Raymond Greenleaf as Lawrence White 
 Tom Powers as Andrew Wharton
 Thomas Browne Henry as Fenway
 Phillip Terry as Lewis Schaefer, Nora's fiancé
 Joseph Sawyer as Whitey Franks
 Lawrence Dobkin as Larry Hansen, Rienzi's lawyer
 Clancy Cooper as Police Captain Finlay
 Willis Bouchey as Henry 
 Joseph Crehan as White's City Editor
 Kasia Orzazewski as Mrs. Schmidt
 James Dean as Copyboy 
 Norman Leavitt as Newsroom reporter

Production
The newspaper used as background on the film, called The Day, is loosely based upon the old New York Sun, which closed in 1950. The original Sun newspaper was edited by Benjamin Day, making the 1952 film's newspaper name (not to be confused with the real-life New London, Connecticut newspaper of the same name) a play on words.

Tough as Nails, a biography of Brooks authored by Douglass K. Daniel, cites the 1931 death of the New York World newspaper as the basis for the film, including the decision by the sons of Joseph Pulitzer to sell the paper rather than run it themselves.  The World was sold to Scripps Howard, which merged it with their New York Telegram to form the New York World-Telegram.  Twenty-one years later, Scripps-Howard also acquired the New York Sun to form the World-Telegram and The Sun.

Reception
Variety gave the film a positive review calling Bogart "convincing".

The film's DVD and Blu-ray debut was in 2016. In the audio commentary, film historian Eddie Muller rates this film as one of the very best films ever made about the inner workings of a major newspaper.

References

External links
 
 

1952 films
American crime films
American black-and-white films
1952 crime films
Films directed by Richard Brooks
Films about journalists
20th Century Fox films
Films scored by Cyril J. Mockridge
James Dean
Films produced by Sol C. Siegel
1950s English-language films
1950s American films